Sergei Nikolayevich Anokhin (born 15 March 1981) is a Russian former professional football player.

Club career
He played 3 seasons in the Russian Football National League for FC Vityaz Podolsk and FC Avangard Kursk.

External links
 

1981 births
Sportspeople from Kaluga
Living people
Russian footballers
Association football forwards
FC Lokomotiv Kaluga players
FC Vityaz Podolsk players
FC Novokuznetsk players
FC Avangard Kursk players